Yishan Wong is an American engineer and entrepreneur who was CEO of Reddit from March 2012 until his resignation in November 2014. With Niniane Wang he is also co-founder of the Mountain View coworking space Sunfire Offices, and an advisor at Quora. Since April 2011, Wong has been a contributing editor at Forbes magazine.

Career

PayPal and Facebook 
Wong worked as a senior engineering manager at PayPal from 2001 to 2005. He is a member of PayPal's early group of employees known collectively as the PayPal Mafia. In 2005, he joined Facebook as a director of engineering on projects including crowd translation. Before leaving Facebook in 2010, he took a liking to Reddit and began posting there.

Reddit CEO 
After three months of talks with Reddit in late 2011, Wong was offered the position of CEO, an offer which he claims friends met with "uproarious laughter".

In 2012, when asked about various controversial Reddit communities, Wong said that the site should provide a platform to objectionable content, saying "We will not ban legal content even if we find it odious or if we personally condemn it." In 2013, he hired Ellen Pao to the board of Reddit as the Vice President of Business Development and Strategic Partnerships and would later recommend her as CEO.

In 2014, Wong took the unusual step of deriding a previous employee who complained about the circumstances surrounding his termination in an AMA. One month later, Reddit board member and YC president Sam Altman announced that Wong was leaving after being unable to garner support for a proposal to move the Reddit office from San Francisco to Daly City. Reportedly, Wong "stopped showing up at the office" when the board ignored his demand. Wong, who thought newer employees would prefer to work in a less expensive area, stated that before the disagreement he had considered leaving due to an abundance of stress.

Terraformation 
In 2017, Wong founded Terraformation to combat climate change through reforestation.

Personal life 
Wong is a graduate of Mounds View High School in Arden Hills, Minnesota, and of Carnegie Mellon University in Pittsburgh, Pennsylvania. He is married to Kimberly Algeri-Wong who holds a Master of Fine Arts in screenwriting.

Wong supported Barack Obama and spoke favorably about Obama's familiarity with the Internet. In 2015, Wong suggested that he might leave the technology industry.

References

External links 
 official website

Facebook employees
Living people
Year of birth missing (living people)
Carnegie Mellon University alumni
PayPal people
Reddit people
American people of Chinese descent
American technology company founders
American technology chief executives
21st-century American businesspeople
Businesspeople from Minnesota